Naphthylvinylpyridine (NVP) is a naphthalene derivative that possesses anticholinergic activity similar to that of atropine.  However, NVP's method of acetylcholine (ACh) antagonism involves inhibiting the enzyme choline acetyltransferase.

Several NVP derivatives have been synthesized and evaluated for their ability to inhibit choline acetyltransferase and protect against nerve toxins.

References 

4-Pyridyl compounds
1-Naphthyl compounds